Edward "Chip" Sarafin is a former American football offensive lineman from Gilbert, Arizona. He was the first active college football player in Football Bowl Subdivision to publicly come out as gay.

College career
Sarafin attended Arizona State University where he walked-on to the football team. His main contribution to the team was as a member of the "scout team" and he was not a regular active player. He also helped the team to a 2013 Pac-12 South Championship where they lost to Stanford in the Pac-12 Championship game.

In the August 2014 issue of Compete Magazine, he became the first active Football Bowl Subdivision player to come out publicly as gay. He had come out to teammates months before the announcement, and posted pictures with his boyfriend on social media. Head coach Todd Graham and Athletic Director Ray Anderson issued statements of support following the announcement. Sarafin cited Michael Sam, who had privately come out to teammates the previous season, as an inspiration. Sam tweeted his support of Sarafin following the announcement. The following week, Sarafin was among five walk-ons put on scholarship for the upcoming season.

See also

 Homosexuality in American football
 List of LGBT sportspeople

References

Living people
American football offensive linemen
Gay sportsmen
LGBT players of American football
LGBT people from Arizona
American LGBT sportspeople
Players of American football from Arizona
Arizona State Sun Devils football players
Year of birth missing (living people)
21st-century LGBT people